Lovro Mihačević (July 23, 1856 in Kreševo – November 25, 1920) was a Bosnian Catholic priest, author, albanologist and epic poet. He served as a missionary in Albania, spoke fluent Albanian, and published the Albanian-related works Po Albaniji (1911) and Albanski problem i Srbija i Austro-Ugarska (The Albanian Problem and Serbia and Austro-Hungary, 1913). He heavily influenced his pupil Gjergj Fishta, a renowned Albanian epic poet.

Mihačević contributed to Albanian culture. While working as missionary in Albania, in Franciscan schools in Troshan and Shkodra, he instilled the love for literature and mother tongue of his pupil, later famous Albanian writer, "Albanian Homer", Gjergj Fishta.

See also
Croatian literature
Albanian literature
Gjergj Fishta

References 

1854 births
1920 deaths
People from Kreševo
Croats of Bosnia and Herzegovina
Franciscans of the Franciscan Province of Bosnia
19th-century Bosnia and Herzegovina Roman Catholic priests
Bosnia and Herzegovina writers
Bosnia and Herzegovina poets
Albanologists
20th-century Bosnia and Herzegovina Roman Catholic priests